Satyajeet Sudhir Tambe Patil is a member of the Maharashtra Legislative Council from the Nashik Graduate constituency in Maharashtra, India.  He contested and won the Maharashtra Legislative Council elections from Nashik Graduate constituency in 2023.
He won the Zila Parishad Elections in 2007 at just 24 years of age, becoming one of the youngest members to win ZP elections.

Early life and education 

Satyajeet Tambe was born in Sangamner to Dr. Sudhir Tambe (Member of Legislative Assembly- Maharashtra) and Mrs. Durgatai Tambe (Mayor of Sangamner). His Grandfather Bhausaheb Thorat was a prominent freedom fighter and one of the pioneers of the cooperative movement in Maharashtra . He belongs to a highly educated family who have been actively involved in Social work in & around North Maharashtra.
Satyajeet Tambe completed his graduation from Pune University & went on to attend the Harvard Kennedy School of Government for his post Graduation.Satyajit Tambe began his career in politics from 2000 working as the party's humble foot soldier. Then, the journey marked the first highlight as a Zilla Parishad member from Ahmednagar District. He was in the office from 2007 to 2017. He also contested assembly elections from Ahmednagar City assembly constituency.

References 

1983 births
Living people
People from Ahmednagar district
Members of the Maharashtra Legislative Council
Independent politicians in India
Indian National Congress politicians from Maharashtra